Datuk Abdul Latif bin Romly   (born 31 March 1997 in Perlis, Malaysia) is a Malaysian Paralympic athlete who broke T20 long jump world record 3 times on the same day and won Malaysia's third gold medal on September 11 at the 2016 Paralympic Games in Rio de Janeiro. He also won the gold medal in the men's long jump T20 event at the 2020 Summer Paralympics held in Tokyo, Japan.

Athletics career
In 2015, Latif set a record-breaking 7.43 m leap to defend his T20 (intellectual disabilities) long jump gold medal at the 2015 Para Asean Games in Singapore. In 2016 Rio Summer Paralympics Games, Latif broke his own world record three times in the same day. He also earned Malaysia's third gold medal of these Paralympics Games. He was chosen as the Malaysian flag bearer at the opening ceremony.

In 2021, Latif became the first Malaysian to defend his Paralympics title in the Men's long jump (F20) event with a leap of 7.45 m.

Honours

Honours of Malaysia 
  :
  Officer of the Order of the Defender of the Realm (K.M.N.) (2017)
  :
  Knight Commander of the Order of the Territorial Crown (PMW) – Datuk (2022)

References

External links
 
2016 Summer Paralympic- Rio 2016 profile

Paralympic athletes of Malaysia
Paralympic gold medalists for Malaysia
Living people
1997 births
People from Perlis
Malaysian male long jumpers
Malaysian Muslims
Malaysian people of Malay descent
World record holders in Paralympic athletics
Track and field athletes with disabilities
Intellectual Disability category Paralympic competitors
Officers of the Order of the Defender of the Realm
Competitors in athletics with intellectual disability
Paralympic medalists in athletics (track and field)
Athletes (track and field) at the 2016 Summer Paralympics
Athletes (track and field) at the 2020 Summer Paralympics
Medalists at the 2016 Summer Paralympics
Medalists at the 2020 Summer Paralympics